Moonbeam City is an American adult animated television series that was created by Scott Gairdner, and starred the voices of Elizabeth Banks, Rob Lowe, Kate Mara and Will Forte. It premiered on Comedy Central on September 16, 2015.

A parody of 1980s cop shows such as Miami Vice and City Hunter, the show was sponsored by the Canadian government and animated by Toronto-based studio Solis Animation using Adobe After Effects software. Moonbeam City featured a distinctive 80s-influenced futuristic visual style with heavy use of neon lighting, inspired by media such as Tron; character designs were similar to the style of the artist Patrick Nagel. A synthwave soundtrack was performed by Night Club.

On March 30, 2016, the series was cancelled after one season.

Characters
 Dazzle Novak (Rob Lowe): Protagonist and Moonbeam City P.D. detective, despite being especially unqualified for the job due to poor impulse control, horrendous reasoning skills, ridiculous libido and ego, and (often) even worse aim. He gets sidetracked from assignments to tend to anything he finds far superior. Any success is normally due to luck or the assistance of others (usually his junior partner, Chrysalis). Has an odd talent for invention and design, and is the son of stuntman Razzle Novak. Dazzle's mother died from cancer when he was a child. He has personal animosity towards Rad in his attempts to outdo him as a cop—-even embarrassing him on a personal level.
 Pizzaz Miller (Elizabeth Banks): Police chief, and Dazzle's irascible supervisor. Though she is sometimes at odds with Dazzle due to his shoddy police work and defiance of authority, she fails to harshly discipline him for even the most severe infractions due to an intense mutual attraction and affection between the two. It is later learned that Pizzaz is an heiress (and eventual sole inheritor) to Moonbeam City's founder, laser prospecting mega-millionaire, Vector Azimuth Miller. Pizzaz also has four abusive and conniving sisters: Charisma, Panache, Sophistica, and Accoutrement. When passionate or angry, Pizzaz narrows her eyes and a slanted window blind-like shadow appears over her face and body, regardless of the location and ambient lighting.
 Chrysalis Zirconia Tate (Kate Mara): Dazzle's rookie colleague. A former lab tech, Chrysalis is the polar opposite of Dazzle (competent, level-headed, responsible), and often the unintentional victim of his irresponsibility and poor impulse control. Chrysalis' job usually entails the detective work and technical aspects of the job, and she is often blamed by Pizzaz for Dazzle and Rad's inept behavior. Chrysalis is the daughter of eccentric Naval Commander Blade H. Tate.
 Radward "Rad" Cunningham/Manning (born: Gregory Manning) (Will Forte): Dazzle's equally incompetent, yet even stupider childish rival/teammate from Canada in the Moonbeam PD. He fears authority more than Dazzle, and is prone to even greater lapses of judgment, usually when trying to outdo or outsmart Dazzle. While initially seeming fierce and threatening in the Pilot episode, Rad is eventually shown to be incredibly cowardly and immature, though not without moments of unexpected (and ill-timed) bravery. The series finale reveals (through Chrysalis' detective work) that Rad is the biological son of the billionaire computer founders of Canadian computer company Flamingo Computers, but was kidnapped as a toddler by the con-artist couple who raised him (he later changes his name to "Radward Manning" to distance himself from them). He has a unique condition called "Mono-Toeism" which causes his right foot to have only one giant toe. He is shown to be very poor as well as perverted. 
 Genesis Jones (Scott Gairdner):  News anchor who appears in every episode. He often acts as more of a shameless announcer or sensationalist rather than a real journalist.
 Mayor Eo Jaxxon (Powers Boothe): Mayor of Moonbeam City who acts a lecherous tyrant. He speaks in a slow raspy register. He has an especially dark infatuation to Chief Pizzaz Miller. He uses his authority to continuously threaten to shutting down the Police Department, and moving the employees into the far more competent and successful Fire Department, in order to extort Pizzaz into having sex with him. He has a foot fetish and always travels with a pair of leopards (which he says can tell when people are lying). He has at least one son, who becomes addicted to the designer drug "Glitzotrene". His name is a reference to the 1986 short film Captain EO and its lead actor, American pop singer Michael Jackson.

Episodes

Broadcast
Internationally, the series premiered in Australia on November 15, 2015 on The Comedy Channel.

Reception
On December 1, 2015, Moonbeam City was nominated for an Annie Award for Best General Audience Animated TV/Broadcast Production, but lost to The Simpsons.

The first season holds a 29% on Rotten Tomatoes based on 14 reviews. Its consensus states: "Moonbeam City wildly overestimates the effectiveness of its attempts at over-the-top humor, leaving viewers with little more than a derivative disappointment". On Metacritic, the series holds a 52% indicating mixed or average reviews.

Mike Hale of The New York Times stated that "the look of Moonbeam City may catch your eye, but after a while, you may be tempted to say, I will bury you so deep the world's smartest worms couldn't find you". He also stated that the pop-culture references and satire were forced and the dialogue "tries so hard you can see it sweat". Daniel Fienberg of The Hollywood Reporter claimed that the show would be able to stand "in a world without Archer" and called it thin and with limited potential. Bob Sassone of The A.V. Club gave it a C+, calling it "more clever than funny with Archer vibes". Brian Lowry of Variety claims that the show settles more for being puerile than clever, making it "less than dazzling". Katy Waldman of Slates review was scathing, stating that the series "is so willfully dumb that it might make you wonder if it is meta-dumb".

References

External links

 
 

2015 American television series debuts
2015 American television series endings
2010s American adult animated television series
2010s American comic science fiction television series
2010s American mystery television series
2010s American parody television series
American adult animated comedy television series
American adult animated science fiction television series
American adult animated mystery television series
American detective television series
English-language television shows
Comedy Central animated television series